The Sarstoon River is a Central American river that forms part of the international border between Belize and Guatemala.

The river's source lies in Guatemala's Alta Verapaz Department. It flows eastward, serving as the border between the departments of Petén and Izabal before passing between Belize's Toledo District (to the north) and Guatemala's Izabal Department (to the south) on its way to the Caribbean Sea. Near its mouth lies Sarstoon Island, in Belizean territory.

The Sarstoon is the internationally accepted southern border between Belize and Guatemala, although as part of the Belizean–Guatemalan territorial dispute since 1999 Guatemala has claimed Belizean territory south of the Sibun River.

On 15 April 2019, the river was the site of a border incident between Guatemala and Belize, when three Guatemalan gun-boats crewed by armed soldiers prevented the Belizean coast guard from patrolling the river.

See also
 Sarstoon Island

References

Rivers of Belize
Rivers of Guatemala
International rivers of North America
Belize–Guatemala border
Toledo District
Border rivers